The New Waddell Dam is an embankment dam on the Agua Fria River in Maricopa County, Arizona,  northwest of Phoenix. It serves as part of the Central Arizona Project (CAP) while also providing water for the Maricopa Water District. The dam creates Lake Pleasant with water from the Agua Fria and also the CAP aqueduct. In addition, it affords flood protection, hydroelectric power production and recreational opportunities. Construction on the dam began in 1985 and ended in 1994. Its reservoir submerged the Old Waddell Dam which was completed in 1927 after decades of planning.

History

Old Waddell Dam

This was to be accomplished with a storage dam, diversion dam and system of canals. Their advancement of the project began in 1888 with the formation of the Agua Fria Water and Land Company. The company hired George Beardsley's Agua Fria Construction Company, and in 1892, construction on the project began. In 1895, Beardsley died, and his brother William who was now president of the Water and Land Company helped continue the project. In 1896, due to a lack of funding caused by poor nationwide economic conditions, the project was halted. The Water and Land Company soon went bankrupt, but William Beardsley would keep the project alive. Work had been primarily done on the diversion dam and canal while only the foundation of the storage dam, a gravity dam, was completed. The diversion dam, Camp Dyer Diversion Dam, was named after Edgar J. Dyer, a surveyor on the project.

After nearly 30 years of struggling with funding and pursuing various deals, William Beardsley hired engineer Carl Pleasant to assist with designing. Pleasant recommended hiring the engineer firm Peckham and James to draft plans for the storage dam at the Frogs Tank site. The gravity dam design was dropped, and a relatively new, cheaper and improved but controversial design was adopted: the multiple-arch buttress dam. In 1925, under a new state law, Beardsley was able to create the Beardsley-Agua Fria Water Conservation District. Under the new district, funds could be raised through a bond issue. On December 20, 1925, the construction contract was signed, but the bonds had yet to be purchased. Five days before the contract was signed, Beardsley died. His son, Robert took direction of the project along with Pleasant. In early 1926, Pleasant eventually sold the needed bonds to the New York firm Brandon, Gordon and Waddell. The firm sent Donald Ware Waddell to oversee construction.

Although the initial implementation of worker camps and site preparation had begun in 1925, the main effort of construction began in 1926 with the diversion of the Agua Fria River. In that same year, the dam was renamed to Pleasant Dam. By February 1927, concrete pouring for the 20 buttresses was nearing completion. The dam was complete in October 1927. Its construction employed a maximum of 600 workers and cost over $3.3 million. Prior to its inauguration, cracks were discovered in the dam's buttresses. This led to much controversy over the new design of the dam and whether it was safe in the long-term which delayed its inauguration until February 1928. The situation was exacerbated on 12 March 1928 after the St. Francis Dam in California had a catastrophic failure. In 1929, after a series of hearings and debates, which eventually reached the state legislature, the State Water Commissioner ordered the spillway for the dam to be lowered  to prevent excess water levels and stress on the dam. It was also required that specific water levels in the reservoir be maintained. The dam was rehabilitated until 1935, and a steel roadbed was installed atop it that same year. In the early 1960s, it was renamed the Waddell Dam.

New Waddell Dam

In 1973, construction on the Central Arizona Project (CAP) began while many of its facilities were still being planned and approved. One integral part of the project was a storage dam on the Salt River, Orme Dam. However, in 1977, US President Jimmy Carter recommended that Orme Dam and two other projects on the Gila River System be removed from the CAP plan because of their negative impacts and cost. While the two other projects (Hooker and Charleston Dam) were easily removed, Orme was not. Orme's removal was hampered by controversy that led to the creation of the Central Arizona Water Control Study (CAWCS) in 1979 after Secretary of the Interior Cecil D. Andrus requested that the Bureau of Reclamation identify a replacement. In 1980, the CAWCS recommended the removal of any storage units on the Gila River. Recent flooding within the CAWCS area and the Orme Dam problem led to an expansion of the study to include dams for flood control.

Three years later, the Bureau of Reclamation and the State of Arizona agreed on an alternative to Orme. This was known as Plan 6, and it recommended four projects: a reconstruction of the Stewart Mountain Dam, a new or larger Roosevelt Dam, the Cliff Dam on the Verde River and finally, the New Waddell Dam on the Agua Fria River (a tributary of the Gila River). On November 6, 1981, the Secretary of the Interior James G. Watt recommended Plan 6. In April 1984, it was approved with the exception of the Cliff Dam, which needed further study and would eventually be removed from CAP.

In 1985, construction on the New Waddell Dam began with the excavation of its foundation. A diversion tunnel was constructed along with another to divert water releases from the Old Waddell Dam to the Beardsley Canal. Construction on the dam's intakes continued through 1991, and by the end of 1992, a controlled breach was performed on two arches of the Old Waddell Dam, allowing its reservoir to fill freely behind the New Waddell Dam, which was already mostly inundated. By 1994, the reservoir was filled and had nearly tripled the size of the Old Waddell Dam reservoir. In that same year, the dam's pump-generating plant (New Waddell Pump-Generating Plant) began operation. The dam's cost was in excess of $625 million. This masonry dam had to be rehabilitated by the Bureau in 1992.

Design and operation

The dam sits at the head of a  catchment area.

Water from the dam's reservoir is released through its outlet works or power plant to either the Waddell Canal or into Hank Raymond Lake, which is formed just downstream of the dam by the Camp Dryer Diversion Dam.

Water from the New Waddell Dam reservoir augments supply in the CAP and helps deliver 15% more CAP water to Arizona. Water in Lake Pleasant is divided between the CAP and MWD. Water from the CAP aqueduct is also drawn into Lake Pleasant via the New Waddell Pump-Generating Plant. During the winter months, when energy rates are low, additional water in the aqueduct is pumped a maximum of  up into the lake for storage. During the summer months, when energy rates are higher, water is released back down through the generators for hydroelectric power production. Sale of this electricity is being used to pay part of the dam's cost.

Recreation
Lake Pleasant, created by the dam, offers recreational opportunities to tourists and locals. The lake is served by a marina and surrounding areas containing over 450 picnic sites, 225 camping sites and several miles of trails. Because the lake is seasonal, fluctuating up to  annually, these facilities are located for accessibility.

Environmental impact
Before the New Waddell Dam was constructed, two phases of a three-phase study were carried out to determine the effects of the dam on fisheries. Completed in 2005, the third phase of the study determined that the larger reservoir has less nutrient concentrations due to CAP water introduction and that water fluctuations have reduced fish cover, likely affecting food and spawning. Large mouth bass populations have also declined but striped bass have entered the lake, likely by eggs transferred through CAP water. Around the lake, Reclamation has taken steps to protect wildlife habitats, including those for bald eagles and Gila topminnows.

References

External links

New Waddell Dam at the U.S. Bureau of Reclamation
 (Old Waddell Dam)

Dams in Arizona
Dams in the Colorado River basin
Earth-filled dams
Buildings and structures in Maricopa County, Arizona
Dams completed in 1994
Energy infrastructure completed in 1994
Hydroelectric power plants in Arizona
Pumped-storage hydroelectric power stations in the United States
United States Bureau of Reclamation dams
Historic American Engineering Record in Arizona
1994 establishments in Arizona